FC Akhtamar, is a defunct Armenian football club from Sevan, Gegharkunik Province. The club was dissolved in early 1994 due to financial difficulties and is currently inactive from professional football.

League record

References
RSSSF Armenia (and subpages per year)

Association football clubs established in 1990
Association football clubs disestablished in 1994
Defunct football clubs in Armenia
1990 establishments in Armenia
1994 disestablishments in Armenia